Villa Real is a barrio (district) of Buenos Aires, Argentina. It is located in the western part of the City of Buenos Aires.

External links

 Barriada: Information on Villa Real
 Automotive museum

Neighbourhoods of Buenos Aires